"Young" is a song written by Naoise Sheridan, Steve McEwan, and Craig Wiseman and recorded by American country music singer Kenny Chesney. It was released in December 2001 as the lead single from Chesney's 2002 album No Shoes, No Shirt, No Problems. The song peaked at number 2 on the US Billboard Hot Country Singles & Tracks chart and at number 35 on the U.S. Billboard Hot 100.

Content
The narrator reflects on what he did when he was in his teen years.

Music video
The music video was Chesney's first of many videos that were directed by Shaun Silva, and produced by Steve Gainer. It premiered on CMT on January 4, 2002, when CMT named it a "Hot Shot". It was filmed in Sanford, Florida, at the old bridge over the St. Johns River, and on the banks of the river.

Chart positions
"Young" debuted at number 50 on the U.S. Billboard Hot Country Singles & Tracks chart for the week of December 29, 2001.

Year-end charts

Certifications

References

2001 singles
2001 songs
Kenny Chesney songs
Songs written by Craig Wiseman
Music videos directed by Shaun Silva
Songs written by Steve McEwan
Song recordings produced by Buddy Cannon
Song recordings produced by Norro Wilson
BNA Records singles